Stobhall (or Stobhall Castle) is a country house and estate in Perthshire in Scotland,  from Perth.  The 17th-century dower house and several other buildings are Category A-listed with Historic Environment Scotland.

The lands at Stobhall have been in the hands of the Drummond family, the Earls of Perth, since the 14th century.  Stobhall Castle  was the ancestral seat of the Drummonds, a stronghold of Roman Catholicism in Scotland after the English Reformation, the Drummonds being staunch Roman Catholic recusants. It is one of two castles (the other is Drummond Castle) traditionally associated with the family.

James IV of Scotland came to Stobhall on 6 February 1498 and was entertained by a lute player.

In 2012, a number of items from the house were auctioned at Bonhams in Edinburgh, raising over £900,000; the heir apparent James David Drummond, Viscount Strathallan (son of John Eric Drummond, 18th Earl of Perth, and paternal grandson of the 17th Earl) decided to move to London.

References

External links
 

Inventory of Gardens and Designed Landscapes
Country houses in Perth and Kinross
Listed castles in Scotland
Dower houses